Uganda Cancer Institute (UCI) is a public, specialized, tertiary care medical facility owned by the Uganda Ministry of Health. The geographical coordinates of the institute are: 00°20'29.0"N, 32°34'40.0"E (Latitude:0.341389; Longitude:32.577778).

Overview
UCI is a cancer treatment, research, and teaching center, affiliated with the Makerere University School of Medicine and with the Mulago National Referral Hospital, the teaching hospital for the medical school. UCI maintains an inpatient facility with a capacity of 80 beds. It attends to an average of about 200 patients daily.

The new building, called the "UCI-Fred Hutch Cancer Centre," is jointly operated by the UCI and the Fred Hutchinson Cancer Center in Seattle, Washington, US as part of the UCI-Fred Hutch Collaboration. In May 2015, the completed facility opened and began attending to patients. In November 2020, the UCI-Fred Hutch Collaboration completed the construction of the new ground-level of the facility, which houses administrative offices and a biorepository.

History
UCI was founded in 1967 with twenty beds, as the Lymphoma Treatment Center, to treat childhood lymphomas, predominantly Burkitt's lymphoma, the most common childhood lymphoma in Uganda and endemic to tropical Africa. In 1969, UCI expanded to a total of 40 beds, when the Solid Tumor Center was added to focus research on Kaposi's sarcoma and liver cancer. "During the 1960s and early 1970s, UCI was a leading international medical research center, in its areas of specialization. UCI established collaboration with the National Cancer Institute (NCI) in Bethesda, Maryland."

In 1972, following the expulsion of Ugandan Asians by dictator Idi Amin, nearly all of NCI's scientists left. "Professor Charles Olweny, a Uganda researcher, interrupted his studies at NCI in the USA and returned to become the first Ugandan director of UCI. In 1982, following the overthrow of Idi Amin, Olweny was forced to leave Uganda for security reasons, leaving leadership of UCI in the hands of Professor Edward Katongole-Mbidde. When Katongole-Mbidde left UCI to become the director at the Uganda Virus Research Institute in 1995, Dr. Jackson Orem took over the helm at UCI. Between 2011 and 2015, the bed capacity at the institute was increased to 80.

International collaboration
The international research centers with collaborative projects with Uganda Cancer Institute include, but are not limited to the following:

 National Cancer Institute – Bethesda, Maryland, US
 Fred Hutchinson Cancer Research Center – Seattle, Washington, US
 Case Western Reserve University – Cleveland, Ohio, US

Brachytherapy
In 2016, the institute installed a "Flexitron Cobalt-60 High Dose Rate" brachytherapy system from Elekta. The system is part of a two-year renovation plan that UCI is implementing at a cost of US$49 million.

Teletherapy
In March 2016, the "Cobalt-60 Teletherapy" unit at UCI, which had been in use for the previous 20 years, broke down. Efforts to acquire a replacement unit are underway, with installation expected in 2018. In the interim, the Uganda Ministry of Health has arranged with the Aga Khan University Hospital in Nairobi, Kenya, to offer teletherapy to some Ugandan patients.

A brand new teletherapy machine, manufactured in the Czech Republic, arrived in Uganda in August 2017. The machine was purchased at a cost of €642,000 (more than UShs2.7 billion), contributed by the government of Uganda and the International Atomic Energy Agency (IAEA). It is expected that installation of the new machine will take at least one month. Following installation and testing of the new machine, the institution started treating patients using the new telepathy machine on 4 December 2017 and officially commissioned it on 19 January 2018.

In February 2020, UCI commissioned a new Bhabhatron II Cancer Therapy Machine, donated to Uganda by the government of India. This machine, which also uses Cobalt 60 as the source of radiation will supplement the one acquired two years earlier from the Czech Republic. The new unit was installed by Indian technicians. A group of Ugandan oncologists and technicians were earlier sent to India to train on how to operate the new machine.
Also in 2018, Samta Memorial Foundation, an Indian-based non-government organization donated a mobile mammography unit that is now in use at UCI.

Medical directors
The following medical researchers have served as director of UCI since its founding in 1967:

 John Ziegler – American: 1967–1972 
 Charles Olweny – Ugandan: 1972–1982
 Edward Katongole-Mbidde – Ugandan: 1982–1995
 Jackson Orem – Ugandan: 1995–Present

See also
 Hospitals in Uganda
 Arua Regional Cancer Centre
 Gulu Regional Cancer Centre
 Mbale Regional Cancer Centre
 Mbarara Regional Cancer Centre

References

External links
 Website of Uganda Cancer Institute
 Nearly Half of Children With Cancer Untreated As of 27 February 2019.
 The New Cancer Facility Is A Beacon of Hope
 Mulago cancer machine: radiotherapy bunker renovation complete

Medical research institutes in Uganda
Hospitals in Kampala
1967 establishments in Uganda
Hospital buildings completed in 1967
Cancer organisations based in Uganda